Caravia Baja is one of two parishes in Caravia, a municipality within the province and autonomous community of Asturias, in northern Spain.

Village and hamlets
 Carrales
 Duesos
 Duyos
 El Valle
 El Visu
 La Espasa

References

Parishes in Caravia